Isanzu is a Bantu language spoken by the Isanzu people south of Lake Eyasi in Tanzania.

The position of Isanzu within the Bantu family is uncertain. It is rather distinct in certain features from other Bantu languages of the area, such as Nyaturu, but is quite close in others. One easily recognizable feature is /h/ in words where neighboring languages have /s/ or /tʃ/, as in the name Isanzu ~ Ihanzu, a feature it shares with Iramba, and a reason it is commonly classified with Iramba.

References

 
Northeast Bantu languages
Languages of Tanzania